This is a list of people associated with University of Mount Union. The University of Mount Union is a 4-year private, coeducational, liberal arts college in Alliance, Ohio.

Alumni

Arts
Carrie Coon - Tony-nominated actress for her role on Broadway in the Steppenwolf revival of Who's Afraid of Virginia Woolf  and also nominated, on several occasions, for Best Supporting Actress in the movie Gone Girl
DW (Dave) Drouillard - vocalist, songwriter and musician
Agnes Thomas Morris - Shakespeare promoter, president of War Mothers of America
Will Lamartine Thompson - writer and composer of "Softly and Tenderly, Jesus is Calling"

Athletics
Jim Ballard - former Mount Union quarterback; member of the College Football Hall of Fame; quarterback in the Arena Football League, Canadian Football League, and NFL Europe; Commissioner of the American Indoor Football League
Paul Bixler - former head football coach at Ohio State University and Colgate University
Matt Campbell - head football coach of the Iowa State Cyclones
Dom Capers - former defensive back of the Mount Union Purple Raiders; former NFL Head Coach for the Carolina Panthers and Houston Texans; current defensive assistant for the Jacksonville Jaguars
Dick Crum - head football coach for Miami University, North Carolina and Kent State University
Sean Donnelly - Post Collegiate / Professional Hammer thrower. Currently resides in Chula Vista, California
Wilmer Fleming - halfback for the NFL's Canton Bulldogs
Pierre Garçon - American football wide receiver, drafted by the Indianapolis Colts in the 2008 NFL Draft, 205th overall; FA signed to Washington Redskins 2012
Bill Herman - professional basketball player for the Denver Nuggets
Charlie Joachim - basketball player
Larry Kehres - highest winning percentage as a head coach in college football (All Divisions) - 303-23-3/.925
Nate Kmic - American football Running Back, All-Time NCAA Rushing Leader with 8,074 yards
Frank Lauterbur - head football coach for the University of Toledo
Ron Lynn - Assistant Football Coach, Stanford University
Harry March - NFL executive; second American Football League founder; medical doctor for the pre-NFL Canton Bulldogs; New York Giants executive; professional football historian and promoter; author of Pro Football: Its Ups and Downs
Erik Raeburn - head football coach at Savannah State University
Lenny Reich - longtime sports information director and 2022 CoSIDA Hall of Fame inductee 
Cecil Shorts III - football wide receiver, drafted by the Jacksonville Jaguars in the 2011 NFL Draft, 114th overall
Nick Sirianni - American football coach and the current head coach of the Philadelphia Eagles
LeRoy Sprankle - high school sports coach and athletics advocate in Eastern Tennessee and South Florida; the "Father of East Tennessee Sports"
E. J. Stewart - former college football coach' professional football player-coach' general manager and founder of the Ohio League's Massillon Tigers

Business
Vincent Marotta – business executive and co-creator of Mr. Coffee
Susan McGalla - former president of American Eagle Outfitters; former chief executive officer of Wet Seal
Timothy Cotton - senior account manager and distribution guru for Alco Chemicals South (formally Nelson Industrial Supplies) and CFO of Cotton Shop Services.

Communication 
 Antonietta "Toni" Gonzalez-Collins - SportsCenter news anchor for ESPN
 Raymond C. Hoiles - newspaper publisher
 Chip Mosher - newspaper columnist; high school "Educator of Distinction;" poet
 Jeff Shreve - American Public Address Announcer and Broadcaster

Education
Bowman Foster Ashe - first president of the University of Miami
Victor Boschini - current Chancellor of Texas Christian University
Henry Solomon Lehr - founder, Ohio Northern University

Medical
Charles Armstrong - virologist, physician in the U.S. Public Health Service
Richard Drake - professor of surgery Cleveland Clinic, Lerner College of Medicine
Shuvo Roy - Bangladeshi-American scientist and engineer; he is the co-inventor of the world's first implantable artificial kidney

Politics and Law
Thomas H. Anderson - United States federal judge
De Witt C. Badger - U.S. Congressman from Ohio
Christopher A. Boyko - United States federal judge
Allen Foster Cooper -  U.S. Congressman from Pennsylvania
Larry Cox - former executive director of Amnesty International USA 
David Hollingsworth - U.S. Congressman from Ohio; an organizer of the Ohio State bar association, serving as its chairman in 1908
Lyman U. Humphrey - 11th Governor of Kansas
Samuel Austin Kendall - U.S. Congressman from Pennsylvania
Philander Knox - Attorney General of the United States in the cabinets of Presidents William McKinley and Theodore Roosevelt; Senator of Pennsylvania; United States Secretary of State for President William Howard Taft
William McKinley - 25th President of the United States 
C. Ellis Moore - U.S. Congressman from Ohio
Miner G. Norton - U.S. Congressman from Ohio
Scott Oelslager - U.S. Congressman from Ohio
Ralph Regula - U.S. Congressman from Ohio
Tim Schaffer - U.S. Congressman from Ohio
Brian L. Stafford - the 20th Director of the United States Secret Service
W. Aubrey Thomas - U.S. Congressman from Ohio

Religion
James Midwinter Freeman - clergyman and writer
John William Hamilton - Bishop of the Methodist Episcopal Church
Francis Enmer Kearns - Bishop of the Methodist Church and the United Methodist Church
Charles Bayard Mitchell - Bishop of the Methodist Episcopal Church
Wesley Matthias Stanford -  Bishop of the United Evangelical Church

Science
Angela Neal-Barnett - First African American tenured professor in the department of psychology at Kent State University
Mary Jobe Akeley - 1897 graduate of Scio College, explorer, photographer, and author of several books about her expeditions
Shuvo Roy - Professor, Department of Bioengineering and Therapeutic Science, University of California, San Francisco; Director, The Kidney Project 
Lorin B. Sebrell - Goodyear Research Director noted for his work on organic accelerators for vulcanization

Writing
Jean E. Karl - an American book editor who founded and lead the children's division, young adult, and science fiction imprints at Atheneum Books; she oversaw/edited books that won 2 Caldecott medals and 5 Newberry medals
Joseph Amasa Munk - wrote about the history of Arizona; works included Arizona Sketches (1905), Arizona Bibliography: Private Collection of Arizoniana (1908), Southwest Sketches (1920), Activities of a Lifetime (1924), History of Arizona Literature (1925), and Story of the Munk Library of Arizoniana (1927)

Other
Annie W. Clark – temperance activist

Notable faculty
 De Scott Evans, noted 19th-century artist, former head of Mount Union art department

References

External links
 Mount Union official site

University of Mount Union
University of Mount Union
Alliance, Ohio

fr:Université de Mount Union